Zeo can refer to:
Dodge ZEO, an electric concept car
Zeos, a home computer company
Power Rangers Zeo, a television series
Zope Enterprise Objects, a storage implementation in a Zope Object Database
A character in the anime Beyblade - see List of Beyblade characters#Zeo
Zeo, Inc., a company that made sleep products
Zamenhof-Esperanto object (ZEO), an object commemorating Esperanto or its creator L. L. Zamenhof
Zéo, a town and sub-prefecture in Montagnes District, Ivory Coast
Gardiehbey Zeo (born 1986), a Liberian footballer